was a feudal domain of the Tokugawa shogunate in Edo period, Japan located in eastern Mikawa Province (modern-day Aichi Prefecture), Japan. It was centered on Okazaki Castle in what is now the city of Okazaki, Aichi. It was ruled by a number of different fudai daimyō over the course of the Edo period. 
Due to its associations with Tokugawa Ieyasu, who was born in Okazaki Castle, the domain had a prestige greater than in its nominal valuation based on rice tax revenues.

History
Matsudaira Kiyoyasu, after gaining control of the area surrounding Okazaki in 1524, demolished the old fortification and built Okazaki Castle. His famous grandson Matsudaira Motoyasu (later named Tokugawa Ieyasu) was born here on December 16, 1542. The Matsudaira were defeated by the Imagawa clan in 1549, and Ieyasu was taken to Sunpu as a hostage. Following the defeat of the Imagawa at the Battle of Okehazama,  Ieyasu regained possession of Okazaki in 1560 and left his eldest son Matsudaira Nobuyasu in charge when he moved to Hamamatsu Castle in 1570. After Oda Nobunaga ordered Nobuyasu’s death in 1579, the Honda clan served as castellans. Following the forced relocation of the Tokugawa to Edo after the Battle of Odawara by Toyotomi Hideyoshi, the castle was given to Tanaka Yoshimasa, who substantially improved on its fortifications, expanded the castle town and developed Okazaki-juku on the Tokaido.

Following the creation of the Tokugawa shogunate, Okazaki Domain was created, and Ieyasu’s close retainer Honda Yasushige was assigned possession of the castle. The Honda were replaced by the Mizuno clan from 1645-1762, and the Matsudaira (Matsui) clan from 1762-1769. In 1769, a branch of the Honda clan returned to Okazaki, and governed until the Meiji Restoration. 
	
In 1869, the final daimyō of Okazaki Domain, Honda Tadanao, surrendered Okazaki Domain to the new Meiji government.  With the abolition of the han system in 1871, Okazaki Domain became part of Nukata Prefecture, with Okazaki Castle used as the prefectural headquarters. However, Nukata Prefecture was merged into Aichi Prefecture in 1872, and the capital of the prefecture was moved to Nagoya.

Okazaki Domain was not a single contiguous territory, but consisted of a number of scattered holdings in Mikawa Province, which at the end of the Edo period included:

 95 villages in Hekinan District
 110 villages in Nukata District
 9 villages in Hazu District

List of daimyō

References

External links
 Okazaki on "Edo 300 HTML"

1601 establishments in Japan
1871 disestablishments in Japan
Domains of Japan
History of Aichi Prefecture
Honda clan
Matsui-Matsudaira clan
Mikawa Province
Mizuno clan
States and territories established in 1601
States and territories disestablished in 1871